Princess Charlotte de La Trémoille (Charlotte Marie Clotilde de La Trémoille; 20 November 1892 – 27 October 1971), 12th Duchess of Thouars, 11th Duchess of La Trémoïlle, 14th Princess de Tarente, 18th princess de Talmond and 18th Countess of Laval was a French noblewoman and the daughter of Prince Louis Charles Marie de La Trémoille and his wife, Hélène Marie Léonie Pillet-Will.

Family
On 13 April 1910, she married Prince Henri-Florent Lamoral of Ligne. They had one son, Prince Jean Charles de La Trémoille. After the death of Charlotte's younger brother, Louis Jean Marie de La Trémoille, she succeeded to his titles and potential claims to the Kingdom of Jerusalem.

References

1892 births
1971 deaths
Belgian princesses
House of La Trémoille
French princesses
French duchesses
Dukes of Thouars
Dukes of La Trémoille
French countesses
People of Byzantine descent